Brahmadeva (1060–1130) was an Indian mathematician. He was the author of Karanaprakasa, which is a commentary on Aryabhata's Aryabhatiya. Its contents deal partly with trigonometry and its applications to astronomy.

External links

1060 births
1130 deaths
11th-century Indian mathematicians
12th-century Indian mathematicians
11th-century Indian astronomers
12th-century Indian astronomers